Janusz Marek Bujnicki (born 1975) is a Polish biologist specializing in molecular biology and bioinformatics, professor of biological sciences, head of the Laboratory of Bioinformatics and Protein Engineering at the International Institute of Molecular and Cell Biology in Warsaw  and a research group at the Laboratory of Bioinformatics at the Institute of Molecular Biology and Biotechnology, Faculty of Biology, Adam Mickiewicz University in Poznań.

Biography 
In 1998 he graduated from the Faculty of Biology of the University of Warsaw, where in 2001 he obtained a doctorate in biological sciences.  In the years 1998-2000 he completed an internship at Henry Ford Hospital in Detroit in the USA, and in 2001 at the National Center for Biotechnology Information (NCBI) of the American National Institutes of Health (NIH) at Bethesda .

He started work at the International Institute of Molecular and Cell Biology in Warsaw in 1999, in 2002 he took over the management of the Laboratory of Bioinformatics and Protein Engineering.  Since 2004 he has also been working at the Laboratory of Bioinformatics at the Institute of Molecular Biology and Biotechnology of the Faculty of Biology at AMU, since 2006 the group leader.

In 2005 he obtained habilitation at the Institute of Biochemistry and Biophysics of the Polish Academy of Sciences in the field of biology.  In 2009 he was awarded the title of professor of biological sciences.

Works in the social movement "Citizens of Science", among others as the author of the "More Good Science" initiative, and as an organizer of conferences and workshops.

Scientific achievements 
Janusz Bujnicki specializes in molecular biology and bioinformatics as well as genomics and microbiology.

The teams he conducts deal with the study of the relationship between the sequence, structure and function of RNA and proteins, and the study of interactions between these molecules.  The research is of theoretical and experimental nature.  As part of the research, bioinformatics software is being developed to for the prediction and modeling of the three-dimensional structure of proteins and RNA.  He is the author of over 200 original works in scientific journals, over 20 review articles and chapters in books.

Membership 
 correspondent member of the Polish Academy of Sciences 
 former member of the European Commission's Group of Chief Scientific Advisors
 member of the Academy of Young Scientists PAS 
 member of the Evolutionary and Theoretical Biology Committee of the Polish Academy of Sciences  and the Committee of Biochemistry and Biophysics PAS 
 Founding member and vice president (2008-2010) and president (2011-2013) of the Polish Bioinformatics Society
 former member of the Life, Environmental and Geo Sciences (LEGS) scientific committee at Science Europe
 member of the scientific committee of the initiative Innovative Medicines Initiative

Decorations and distinctions 
Laureate of the Young Scientist Program of the European Organization of Molecular Biology (EMBO) and the American Medical Institute Howard Hughes (HHM) in 2002.  The first Polish laureate of the grant in the field of biological sciences awarded by the European Research Council (ERC) in 2010.  In 2013, he won the plebiscite "Poles with Verve" in the Science category.  Winner of the National Center for Science Award in 2014.

In 2014 he was awarded the Knight's Cross of the Order of Polonia Restituta by President Bronisław Komorowski.

References

External links 
 The official website of Bujnicki Lab

1975 births
Living people
Polish biologists
University of Warsaw alumni